Robert Todd is the name of:

Robert Bentley Todd (1809–1860), Irish physician who described Todd's palsy
Robert Todd (pioneer) (c. 1757–1814/20), Kentucky soldier and politician
Robert Todd (field hockey), English field hockey player
Robert E. Todd (Republican), 9th director of Ellis Island, from 1921 to 1923
Robert H. Todd (born 1942), professor of mechanical engineering at Brigham Young University
Robert Miles Todd, World War I flying ace
Robert Smith Todd (1791–1849), father of U.S. first lady Mary Todd Lincoln
Bob Todd (footballer) (born 1949), English footballer 
Bob Todd (baseball) (born 1948), college baseball coach
Bobby Todd (1904–1980), German actor
Robert Todd (filmmaker) (born 1963), American filmmaker
Robert Asa Todd, California and Arizona journalist and member of the Los Angeles City Council
Robert Barr Todd (1826–1901), Justice of the Louisiana Supreme Court

See also  
Bob Todd (Brian Todd, 1921–1992), English comedy actor